Poplaca is a commune in Sibiu County, Transylvania, Romania, at the foothills of the Cindrel Mountains, 12 km south-west of the county capital Sibiu, in the Mărginimea Sibiului ethnographic area. It is composed of a single village, Poplaca.

References

Communes in Sibiu County
Localities in Transylvania